The 2003–04 season was Olympiacos's 45th consecutive season in the Alpha Ethniki and their 78th year in existence. The club were played their 7th consecutive season in the UEFA Champions League. In the beginning of the summertime Olympiacos named Greek Nikos Alefantos coach.

Squad

Competitions

Alpha Ethniki

League standings

Results summary

Results by round

UEFA Champions League

Group stage

All times at CET

Team kit

|

|

|

References

External links 
 Official Website of Olympiacos Piraeus 

2003-04
Greek football clubs 2003–04 season